The Singapore International or Singapore Satellite, Cheers Asian Satellite is an open international badminton tournament in Singapore. In the last few years, this tournament has been an International Series level. There is another tournament with higher level and prize money, which is the Singapore Open.

Past winners

References

External links
Singapore Badminton Association

Sports competitions in Singapore
Badminton tournaments in Singapore